The UCI Road World Championships - Men's under-23 time trial is the annual world championship for road bicycle racing in the discipline of individual time trial for men aged 23 or under, organised by the world governing body, the Union Cycliste Internationale. The event was first run in 1996 but in 2020 no race was held due to the COVID-19 pandemic. 
Mikkel Bjerg is the most successful rider in the discipline, having won the event on three occasions.

Medal winners

Medallists by nation

 
Men's under-23 time trial
Men's road bicycle races
Lists of UCI Road World Championships medalists
Under-23 cycle racing